Legality of drugs may refer to:

 Drug regulation
 Drug legalization
 Prohibition of drugs

See also
 Drug trade